A solitary trichoepithelioma is a cutaneous condition characterized by a firm dermal papules or nodules most commonly occurring on the face.

See also 
 Trichoepithelioma
 Skin lesion
 List of cutaneous conditions

References 

Epidermal nevi, neoplasms, and cysts